Ambrosius (birth name Risto Jääskeläinen, b. 10 August 1945 Tohmajärvi, Finland,) is the retired Metropolitan of Helsinki. He matriculated from the Joensuu Lyceum in 1964. He completed the degree of Master of Theology at Helsinki University in 1968. He also completed the degree of Master of Political Science in 1972.

Career, ordinations and consecrations

Risto Jääskeläinen worked as the rector of the Nurmes Evangelical School during 1967–1968 and as a lecturer of the Orthodox Theological Seminary of Finland during 1969–1970. He has been a research fellow in the United States in 1969, in Hungary in 1969–1970, in the United Kingdom during 1971–1975, in the Soviet Union in 1979, and again in the United States during 1986–1987.

He was ordained a Lutheran minister in 1969, but he resigned from Lutheran priesthood in 1975. In 1974 he worked as an acting lecturer in University of Joensuu and during 1975–1976 acting assistant professor in the same university. He was tonsured an Orthodox monk in 1979, and the same year he was ordained a deacon and a hieromonk in the New Valamo Monastery. While still a novice, his name was brother Kristoforos, but as a monk his name became Ambrosius. He was first the treasurer of New Valamo during 1977–1988, and during 1986–1988 also the deputy head of the monastery.

In 1988, Ambrosius was elected Bishop of Joensuu, i.e. a vicar bishop of the Finnish Orthodox Church, and in 1996 he was elected Metropolitan of Oulu, and finally Metropolitan of Helsinki in 2002. He retired from this see at the beginning of 2018.

He has been a member of the Administrative Body of the Finnish Orthodox Church since 1996.

Ambrosius is also a board member in a company called Tulikivi and the president of the board of Fine, which an organization of the finance sector in Finland. He has cooperated with the freemasons, but he resigned from this organization in the 1980s. The Orthodox canons forbid the Orthodox to belong to secret societies, but according to Ambrosius, this does not concern today's freemasonry.

Festschrift
A book was published in the honour of Ambrosius' 60th birthday in 2005. The writers consisted of his "network", and included e.g. President Tarja Halonen.

A woman in the altar controversy in 2015
On the first Sunday of March 2015, Ambrosius ordained new priests in the Uspenski Cathedral in Helsinki. He had invited the Lutheran bishop of Helsinki, Irja Askola to attend the occasion. During the liturgy, Askola had been shown a place on the kliros, near the iconostasis, but during the ordination, which lasted about 10 minutes, Ambrosius invited her into the altar. In addition to this, the deacons read prayers for "Bishop Irja" and "our Bishop Irja".

This caused great controversy, with first Archbishop Leo and then the retired vicar of the Helsinki Orthodox Parish, Father Veikko Purmonen criticized the act. According to the archbishop, the presence of a woman in the altar and the prayers of the deacons were "against the liturgical order of the Orthodox church." The archbishop also considered that "the members of our church are first and foremost Orthodox, and only secondarily Finns. This is also the starting point of ecumenism. In the Orthodox Church, critical review of the tradition is practiced outside the holy space."

Purmonen wrote that the "incident in the Uspensky Cathedral was not about openness but about something altogether different. The boundaries of what is traditionally accepted were crossed. … I understand completely the deep shock and the strong protests of the church goers, when they were forced to watch an ecumenical play, for which they had not been prepared at all." Purmonen went on to say that "even in elementary school all Orthodox children are taught that according to the canons, only those who have a task there can enter the altar. Women are unequivocally forbidden to go there."

Father Heikki Huttunen and Metropolitan Ambrosius wrote replies to Leo and Purmonen. Huttunen wrote that "for the Orthodox, it an important challenge to recognize the holy tradition from the ornamental tradition, and to be able to separate it from the weight of various historical eras. One area of life that the Orthodox theologians have discussed for a long time is the position of the woman in the church. The Orthodox faith does not teach that women are ritually impure in a way that would dictate that women cannot enter holy spaces. Such a belief may exist on the fringes of the life of the church, but it is not part of the Gospel that the church ought to proclaim."

According to Ambrosius, he had made "a beautiful ecumenical gesture … We were thankful that a Lutheran bishop wanted to see the event and learn about it and to experience the ordination in our church. After all, this is something that is in the core of the spiritual life of our church.”

He commented on the principles surrounding this controversy as follows: “Our synod reminded us about the sanctity of the altar in 2001: the altar is a holy place. No one has the right to go there, neither man or woman, unless he or she has a special blessing for it or some task to perform there. This rule therefore applies to men and women alike. As far as it is known, no canon forbids women to enter the altar. … It is a special challenge for a minority church to grow away from such inwardly oriented and excessively emphasized pride. And as we represent an unbroken chain of faith, ever since early Christianity, the value of this tradition is tested by our readiness to share its treasures with other Christians.”

The controversy went on, when Archbishop Leo wrote about it to Bartholomew I, the Patriarch of Constantinople. The Holy Synod of the Ecumenical Patriarchate then wrote to Ambrosius e.g. the following:

Ambrosius commented on the letter from Constantinople as follows:

Ambrosius was of the opinion that he had done nothing untoward by inviting Askola to the altar:

Works

Books edited 
 Valamon juhlakirja ('Festschrift for Valamo'), 1977
 Ortodoksinen kirkko Suomessa ('The Orthodox Church in Finland'), 1979
 Kristinuskon syntysijoilla – Islamin keskellä ('In the birthplace of Christianity – Surrounded by Islam'), 2001
 Henkinen johtajuus ('Psychological leadership'),  & Henrikki Tikkanen, Timo Kietäväinen, 2009

Awards and recognitions 
 Finnish State Award from the Committee for Public Information, 1980
 Kuopio city award for promoting culture, 1996
 the title of an archimandrite, 1986
 Commander of the Order of the White Rose of Finland
 Commander of the Order of the Holy Lamb of the Finnish Orthodox Church
 Commander of the Order of the Phoenix of Greece, 1st class
 Commander of the Order of the Cross of Terra Mariana (3rd class)
 Order of St. Plato of Estonian Apostolic Orthodox Church, 3rd class
 Order of St. Plato of Estonian Apostolic Orthodox Church, 2nd class, 2017

See also 
 Orthodoxy
 Metropolitan bishop
 Bishop
 Helsinki Orthodox Diocese
 Uspenski Cathedral, Helsinki

References

External links 
 Metropoliitta Ambrosius / Ortodoksi.net (Finnish)
 Home pages of Metropolitan Ambrosius.
 A photo of Metropolitan Ambrosius.
 Jussi Vilkuna: Ovatko kaikki suuret kertomukset kuolleet? (‘Have all the great stories died out’) (Finnish) Kaltio 2/1999.

Eastern Orthodox metropolitans
Bishops of the Orthodox Church of Finland
Vicar bishops of the Finnish Orthodox Church
1945 births
Living people
People from Tohmajärvi
University of Helsinki alumni
Converts to Eastern Orthodoxy from Lutheranism